Igor Ryurikovich Kholmanskikh (born 29 June 1969) is a former Russian government appointee and former factory worker. He served as the presidential envoy to Ural Federal District, and a member of the Security Council of Russia, from 2012 to 2018.

Early life 
Igor Kholmanskikh was born in 1969. His parents worked for Uralvagonzavod, a factory in Nizhny Tagil, Sverdlovsk Oblast, Russia. Kholmanskikh graduated with a degree in mechanics from the Nizhny Tagil branch of the Ural State Technical University in 1994.

Career 
Kholmanskikh worked a foreman for Uralvagonzavod, where he became the chief assembly manager in August 2011.

During the 2012 Russian presidential election, Kholmanskikh expressed support for candidate Vladimir Putin on national television. Once Putin was elected as president, he appointed Kholmanskikh as the presidential envoy to Ural Federal District "without any prior government or political experience." He also serves on the Security Council of Russia.

In her 2017 book, Democracy: Stories from the Long Road to Freedom, former US Secretary of State Condoleezza Rice writes that Kholmanskikh's appointment "bears a strong resemblance to the folklore of an era long past. Heroic laborers who through hard work and grit industrialized the country and farmed the land have long been admired, whether in Russia or the Soviet Union."

On 26 June 2018, Kholmanskikh was replaced by Nikolay Tsukanov. On 9 July 2018 he became head of the board of directors of Uralvagonzavod.

References 

Living people
1969 births
1st class Active State Councillors of the Russian Federation
People from Nizhny Tagil
Presidential Administration of Russia